Oslo Airport Station, also known as Gardermoen Station, is a railway station located in the airport terminal building of Oslo Airport, Gardermoen in Norway. Located on the Gardermoen Line, it is served by the Airport Express Trains, express trains to Trondheim and Oslo, regional trains to Lillehammer and Skien (via Oslo) and commuter trains to Eidsvoll and Kongsberg (via Oslo).

The station is staffed, and there is a single bus route, and several coach services, to and from the airport. It opened in 1998, along with the new airport. During 2000–2001, there were several derailments at the station. South of the station is a terminal for unloading freight trains carrying aviation fuel.

Location
Gardermoen is at kilometer marker 51.85 (32.22 mi) from Oslo S, but the actual distance is only . This is because the distance markers follow the slightly longer Hoved Line between Oslo and Lillestrøm. The station is built directly below the airport terminal, and access is obtained via escalators or elevators located in the airport's arrival hall. North of the station, the tracks run in a tunnel below the terminal and runway area. The tracks on platform 2 and 3 only have connection southwards; north of the station they are only connected to a short turning track.

Aviation fuel is transported to the airport by train. CargoNet hauls a daily train load of fuel from Sjursøya, with an unloading terminal just south of the passenger station. They are the only freight trains to use the Gardermoen Line.

Services

Services are provided by Vy, the Airport Express Train and SJ Norge. The outer side platforms (1 and 4) serve VY and SJ Norge trains, while the two inner island platforms (2 and 3) serve the Airport Express Trains.

The station is staffed from 07:00 to 22:00 on weekdays, with reduced opening hours on weekends. The platform (but not necessarily the trains) are wheelchair accessible, and an escort service for disabled persons can be prebooked. Baggage trolleys are available, and a wide selection of services, including cafes, kiosks, banks and police, are available at the airport terminal, as are taxis. A single local bus route, Ruter no. 855, also serves the airport from Kløfta, Jessheim and Maura. There are many coaches from all parts of the country that also serve the airport, as well as coach services to Oslo operated by Flybussekspressen and SAS Ground Services.

Airport Express Train

The Flytoget airport express train services operate six times per hour. Three run directly to Oslo Central Station in nineteen minutes and terminate there; the other three services make an additional stop at Lillestrøm Station, then continue beyond Oslo Central towards Drammen Station, a total of eight stops. Total travel time to Drammen is 60 minutes. In 2007, the Airport Express Train had 5.35 million passengers.

Vy
The Oslo Commuter Rail operated by Vy, provides one service in each direction each hour—line R12 from Kongsberg Station via Oslo Central to Eidsvoll Station. Vy also provides 2 regional services each hour—Line RE10 Drammen - Lillehammer and Line RE11 Eidsvoll - Skien.

SJ Norge
On the Dovre Line to Trondheim Central Station, five daily express trains are also offered, including one night train. These services do not allow local traffic between Oslo and the airport, since the station is "entry only" for northbound trains towards Trondheim and "exit only" for southbound trains towards Oslo.

History

The decision to build the station, railway and airport was taken by the Parliament on 8 October 1992. NSB Gardermobanen, a subsidiary of the Norwegian State Railways, was created to build the line and station, as well as operate the Flytoget airport express train services. Construction of the station was performed in parallel with the construction of the airport, and the station is built in the same style as the rest of the airport, in postmodernist concrete and wood.

The station was taken into use on 27 September 1998, and public services commenced along with the opening of the airport on 8 October 1998. In 2001, as part of a reorganization of NSB Gardermobanen, the ownership of the station was transferred to the Norwegian National Rail Administration.

Incidents
In 2000–01, the Airport Express Train experienced three derailments with empty trains at Gardermoen; one caused by the engineer falling asleep and two by the train passing a red light. No more such accidents occurred after automatic train control was installed in 2001.

References

External links

 , Norwegian National Rail Administration
 , Flytoget
 , Vy
 Norwegian Railway Club entry
 Interchange information, from Avinor

Railway stations in Ullensaker
Railway stations on the Gardermoen Line
Airport railway stations in Norway
Railway stations opened in 1998
1998 establishments in Norway
Flytoget
Oslo Airport, Gardermoen